Josef Valčík (2 November 1914 – 18 June 1942) was a Czechoslovak British-trained soldier and member of the Resistance in German-occupied Czechoslovakia who took part in the firefight during the aftermath of the assassination of Reinhard Heydrich by Jozef Gabčík and Jan Kubiš, code named Operation Anthropoid.

Operation Anthropoid

SS-Obergruppenführer Heydrich, a high-ranking German Nazi official, was chief of the Reich Security Main Office and one of the main architects of the Holocaust. He was also Stellvertretender Reichsprotektor of Bohemia and Moravia in 1942.

The Germans were unable to locate the attackers until Karel Čurda of the "Out Distance" sabotage group turned himself in to the Gestapo and gave them the names of the team's local contacts for the reward of one million Reichsmarks. Valčík and the others died after a six-hour firefight with Waffen-SS troops and German police in the Saints Cyril and Methodius Cathedral.

Family
14 members of Valčík's family were arrested, brought to Mauthausen concentration camp and executed.
Parents Jan Valčík (1880-1942) and Veronika Valčík (1888-1942)
Brother Antonín Valčík (1919-1942) and sister Ludmila Valčíková (1923-1942)
Sister Terezia Beňová (1912-1942) with husband Jan Beňa (1908-1942)
Sister Marii Kolaříková (1917-1942) with husband Josef Kolařík (1914-1942)
Sister Františku Sívková (1911-1942) with husband František Sívek (1910-1942)
Brother Aloise Valčík (1908-1942) with wife Anna Valčíková (1907-1942)
Brother Emil Valčík (1909-1942) with wife Anna Valčíková (1911-1942)

Honours
1942 –  – Czechoslovak War Cross 1939–1945
1942 –  – Second Czechoslovak War Cross 1939–1945 in memoriam
1944 –  – Commemorative Medal of the Czechoslovak Army Abroad with France and Great Britain Bars
1945 –  – Third Czechoslovak War Cross 1939–1945 in memoriam
1949 –  – Czechoslovak Military Order for Freedom, Gold Star
1968 –  – Order of the Red Banner
2010 –  – Cross of Merit of the State Defense

See also
 Operation Anthropoid
 German occupation of Czechoslovakia
 Resistance in German-occupied Czechoslovakia

References

1914 births
1942 deaths
Czech resistance members
Czechoslovak military personnel of World War II
Czechoslovak military personnel killed in World War II
Czechoslovak soldiers
Operation Anthropoid
People from Valašské Klobouky
People killed by Nazi Germany
Resistance members killed by Nazi Germany
Recipients of the Czechoslovak War Cross